The Lebanese Handball Federation (LHF) is the administrative and controlling body for handball and beach handball in Lebanese Republic. Founded in 1968, LHF is a member of Asian Handball Federation (AHF) and the International Handball Federation (IHF).

National teams
 Lebanon men's national handball team
 Lebanon men's national junior handball team
 Lebanon women's national handball team

References

External links
 Lebanon at the IHF website.
 Lebanon at the AHF website.

Handball in Lebanon
Handball
Sports organizations established in 1968
1968 establishments in Lebanon
Handball governing bodies
Asian Handball Federation
National members of the International Handball Federation
Organisations based in Beirut